Erzincanspor was a sports club located in Erzincan, Turkey. The football club played in the Iddaa League B in 2007–2008 season and relegated to Third League in 2008 and Erzincan Amateur League in 2008–2009 season. The club folded in 2014, and is unofficially succeeded by 24 Erzincanspor.

League participations
TFF First League: 1980–1982, 1985–1990, 1995–1999

TFF Second League: 1969–1980, 1984–1985, 1990–1995, 1999–2005, 2006–2008

TFF Third League: 2005–2006, 2008–2009

Turkish Regional Amateur League: 2010–11, 2012–2014

Amatör Futbol Ligleri: 1982–1984, 2009–2010, 2011–2012

References

Official Site

 
Sport in Erzincan
Football clubs in Turkey
Association football clubs established in 1968
1968 establishments in Turkey